Hyperview is the third and final studio album by American rock band Title Fight. The album was released on February 3, 2015 through ANTI- Records and was produced by Will Yip at Studio 4 Recording. This marks the third time Title Fight has worked with Yip, following Floral Green (2012) and Spring Songs EP (2013). It was mastered by Emily Lazar and Richard Morales at The Lodge, in New York.

Hyperview produced the singles "Chlorine" and "Rose of Sharon". The album marked a change in the band's style from the energetic hardcore punk of previous records to a fuzzier and more textured sound rooted in shoegaze and indie rock. It would also be the last recording released by Title Fight before they would go on hiatus in mid 2018. It would go on to receive positive reviews from critics who praised their growth and stylistic shift.

Background and production
In 2012, Title Fight released their second album, Floral Green, and followed it up with the 2013 EP, Spring Songs. On July 24, 2014 it was announced that Title Fight had signed to ANTI-. The band said that their "ability to choose our own path regardless of current or past status quos is a defining characteristic" of the band. With signing to ANTI-, they said that "these qualities will be strengthened and supported."

Title Fight's previous efforts were compared to the likes of Gorilla Biscuits and Lifetime. For Hyperview, the band approached it with a sound reminiscent of Shudder to Think and Slowdive. The album's sound has been described as dream pop, indie rock, post-punk, and shoegaze. Bassist Ned Russin said the group was "looking at bands like maybe Dinosaur Jr. and the Beach Boys — we were looking at the moment where they found something that had never been done before and was now being done well. We were just chasing that energy." Hints of the Hyperview sound could be heard in their previous work. Russin claimed that the album was "the most melodic, simple stuff" the band have created. According to the band, the title Hyperview, "is a state of increased vision, of acute awareness. One in which foresight is even sharper than hindsight." "Chlorine" was "a culmination of all attributes, but not limited to any particular one."

Release
On December 1, Hyperview was announced for release, with the artwork and track listing being revealed. It was announced while the band were part-way through a tour with Circa Survive and Pianos Become the Teeth. On the same day, a music video was released for "Chlorine" via The FADER. It was directed by Jonny Look. "Chlorine" was released as a single a day later. On January 12, 2015 a music video was released for "Rose of Sharon", it was directed by Hannah Roman. The video features a young person watching films on his television, interspersed with footage of the band. A day later, the song was released as a single.

"Your Pain Is Mine Now" was made available for streaming via Vogue on January 19. On January 27, the album was made available for streaming. Hyperview was released on February 3 through ANTI-. The band held a record release show at Gallery of Sound in Wilkes-Barre, Pennsylvania. In mid March, the band toured the U.S. with support from Merchandise and Power Trip. In late March and early April, the band toured alongside La Dispute with support from The Hotelier. In May, the band toured across Europe with support from Milk Teeth, Cold World and Drug Church. The band went on a tour of the U.S. in October and November.

Reception

Compared to previous albums, Title Fight's third effort was not as well received by critics. Some cite the reason for the more mixed reviews was due to the evolution of their sound from a punk and hardcore based noise, to a more distorted, shoegaze-influenced sound.  Nevertheless, Hyperview received generally positive reviews overall from professional critics. Album aggregator, Metacritic, gave the album 71/100 indicating "generally favorable reviews".

In a positive review for Exclaim!, Branan Ranjanathan wrote that "the heavily distorted, fuzzy wall of sound from previous albums has been replaced by lead guitar jangle here, but while that may seem off-putting to fans who are accustomed to the relentless punk bludgeoning of their previous material, at its core the songwriting is solid, and familiar enough for old fans to learn to love." Zoe Camp of Pitchfork also gave the album a positive review, praising the songwriting of the band.

The album was included on Grantland's "10 Great Albums From 2015 (So Far) You Might Have Missed" and "Pop-Punk Is the New Indie Rock (or Perhaps the Old Alt Rock)" lists. "Chlorine" was included on Grantland's "Songs of the Week" list.

Track listing
All songs written by Title Fight.

"Murder Your Memory" – 2:36
"Chlorine" – 3:08
"Hypernight" – 2:56
"Mrahc" – 2:11
"Your Pain Is Mine Now" – 4:03
"Rose of Sharon" – 2:50
"Trace Me Onto You" – 4:02
"Liar's Love" – 3:26
"Dizzy" – 4:21
"New Vision" – 2:14

Personnel 
Title Fight
 Jamie Rhoden – guitar, vocals
 Ned Russin – bass, theremin, vocals
 Shane Moran – guitar, synthesizer, layout
 Ben Russin – drums

Production
 Will Yip – producer, composer, engineer, mixing
 Susy Cerejo - photography
 Brianna Collins – layout
 Emily Lazar – mastering
 Rich Morales – mastering assistant
 Todd Pollock – photography
 Jay Preston – studio assistant
 Vince Ratti – mixing
 John Garrett Slaby – cover photo

Charts

References 
Footnotes

Citations

External links

Hyperview at YouTube (streamed copy where licensed)

Title Fight albums
2015 albums
Anti- (record label) albums
Albums produced by Will Yip